Edwin Lineham (28 April 1879 – 12 August 1949) was an English first-class cricketer.

Lineham represented Hampshire in a single first-class match in 1898 against Lancashire. Lineham made a duck in Hampshire's first innings and in Hampshire's second innings Lineham was promoted up the batting order to number two, where he remained unbeaten on 0.

Lineham died at Fratton, Portsmouth, Hampshire on 12 August 1949.

External links
Edwin Lineham at Cricinfo
Edwin Lineham at CricketArchive

1879 births
1949 deaths
Cricketers from Portsmouth
English cricketers
Hampshire cricketers